The Kerry-Mayo rivalry is a Gaelic football rivalry between Irish county teams Kerry and Mayo, who first played each other in 1905. It is considered to be one of the biggest rivalries in Gaelic games. Kerry's home ground is Fitzgerald Stadium and Mayo's home ground is MacHale Park, however, all but one of their championship meetings have been held at neutral venues, usually Croke Park. The first championship meeting between the two counties to take place in either Kerry or Mayo was in 2019 when they played each other in Fitzgerald Stadium at the All-Ireland quarter-final group stage.

While Kerry have the highest number of Munster Senior Football Championship titles and Mayo are the standard bearers in Connacht, they have also enjoyed All-Ireland Senior Football Championship successes, having won 40 championship titles between them to date.

They have met 28 times with Kerry winning 19 times, Mayo winning 5 times, with 4 Draws

All-time results

Legend

Senior

References

Mayo
Mayo county football team rivalries